Zverinogolovsky (masculine), Zverinogolovskaya (feminine), or Zverinogolovskoye (neuter) may refer to:
Zverinogolovsky District, a district of Kurgan Oblast, Russia
Zverinogolovskoye, a rural locality (a selo) in Zverinogolovsky District of Kurgan Oblast, Russia